"The Man in the Bottle" is episode 38 of the American television series The Twilight Zone. It originally aired on October 7, 1960 on CBS.

Opening narration

Plot
A poor elderly woman visits Arthur Castle, an unsuccessful antiques dealer, bringing a wine bottle she found in a trash can. It has no value, but he buys it for a small amount out of pity. The bottle proves to contain a genie, who offers to grant four wishes to Castle and his wife. They use their first wish to repair a broken glass cabinet, proving the genie's power, and then receive a million dollars in cash upon making their second wish. After they have given tens of thousands away to their friends, an IRS employee visits the shop and presents the Castles with a tax bill that leaves them with only $5 once they pay it.

The genie warns them that every wish has consequences, and that they should think carefully before making their next one. Castle decides that he wants to be in a position of great power, and wishes to be a leader - who cannot be voted out of office - of a modern and powerful country. He is turned into Adolf Hitler and transported to the last days of World War II; he is hiding in the Führerbunker as one of his men brings him a vial of cyanide so he can kill himself. In desperation, he wishes to be returned to his old life and throws the vial to the floor.

In an instant, Castle's final wish is granted and he is returned to his shop, where the wine bottle shatters on the floor. He and his wife have nothing to show for their experience except a repaired cabinet — which Castle accidentally breaks again as he sweeps up — and a changed perspective on life. He dumps the pieces of the bottle into a trash can outside; they magically reform into a whole bottle, waiting for someone else to pick it up and release the genie.

Closing narration

Production notes

Luther Adler previously had portrayed Hitler in two 1951 feature films: The Magic Face, a fantasy about a European impersonator who somehow manages to murder Hitler and then assumes his identity, and The Desert Fox, a drama about Erwin Rommel.

Both the 1891 short story "The Bottle Imp" by Robert Louis Stevenson and the 1901 short story "The Monkey's Paw" by W.W. Jacobs feature an object containing a supernatural power that can grant the wishes of its human possessors, indicating that such is a dangerous power to enjoy.

See also
List of The Twilight Zone (1959 TV series) episodes

References
DeVoe, Bill. (2008). Trivia from The Twilight Zone. Albany, GA: Bear Manor Media. 
Grams, Martin. (2008). The Twilight Zone: Unlocking the Door to a Television Classic. Churchville, MD: OTR Publishing.

External links
 

The Twilight Zone (1959 TV series season 2) episodes
1960 American television episodes
Cultural depictions of Adolf Hitler
Genies in television
Television episodes written by Rod Serling
Television episodes set in Berlin
Television episodes about World War II